Menerville or Ménerville may refer to:
 Ménerville, a French village.
 Ménerville, an old name of Thenia town in Algeria.